The Going broke universities – Disappearing universities (危ない大学・消える大学 Abunai Daigaku Kieru Daigaku) is a ranking book about Japanese Universities by Japanese journalist , published annually since 1993.

Although there are several university rankings in Japan, most of them rank universities by their entrance difficulties often called "Hensachi" or by alumni's successes. Especially, the Hensachi Rankings have been most commonly used for university ranking. From this view point, GBUDU is a typical ranking book in Japan.

The GBUDU ranks Japanese Universities in terms of the entrance difficulty and selectivity. The author's main argument is that more selective universities have better quality, and generally guarantee students better future careers. Thus people should avoid least selective universities, and try to enter more selective ones as much as they can.

Methodology
The GBUDU rankings are made by the average scores of Hensachi estimated by Japanese major prep school Yoyogi seminar. Consequently, it can be regarded as a summary of the selectivity of Japanese universities.

He prepared the following 10 scales to measure universities' entrance difficulties.

2010 rankings
The following data is the 2010 ranking table only in Rank SA (1st), Rank A1 (2nd), Rank A2 (3rd) and Rank B (4th) even though there are additionally Rank C, Rank D, Rank E, Rank F, Rank G, Rank N, Rank "on hold" and others (from the higher to the lower).

References

External links
 GBUDU rakings 2012
 GBUDU rakings 2011
 GBUDU rakings 2010

Japan
Universities and colleges in Japan
Book series introduced in 1993
Japanese books